Choreutis montana is a moth of the family Choreutidae. It is known from China (Qinghai), Kyrgyzstan, Tajikistan, and Kazakhstan.

The wingspan is 12–14 mm. The basic color of the forewings is gray with whitish granulation. The basal area is bordered by an oblique but straight black line, which disappears in the region of the median cell. There is large white granulation on the middle area, forming two broad diffused light gray transverse stripes. The inner transverse stripe is usually narrower than the outer stripe. The latter is bordered by a blackish line interrupted in the middle and always isolated from the outer field. This area consists of two stripes of almost equal width. The stripe adjoining the black line is light gray with whitish granulation and the other stripe adjoining the fimbria is dark brown. The hindwings are dark gray, but lighter in the region of the cell.

The larvae feed on Malus, Amelanchier, and Ulmus pumila. They develop on the fruits of their host plant.

References

Choreutis
Moths described in 1973